RFA Sea Salvor (A503) was a salvage vessel of the post-war Royal Fleet Auxiliary. She also served as a support ship for Mine Counter Measures vessels.

Built by the Goole Shipbuilding & Repair Co. Ltd., Goole, the ship was launched on 22 April 1943, and commissioned in February 1944. Decommissioned in April 1971, the ship was laid up at HMNB Devonport, and arrived at Grays, Essex for scrapping on 18 January 1973.

Service history
She spent February to May 1954 recovering the wreckage of the British Overseas Airways Corporation's de Havilland Comet G-ALYP "Yoke Peter" which crashed on 10 January 1954 after taking off from Rome, Italy. Sea Salvor deployed for service during "Operation Musketeer" - the Suez Crisis - in December 1956.

Crew

Diver John Richard Cresdee, who died on 30 October 1957 is buried at Kalkara Naval Cemetery, Malta. His name was actually Jack Richard Cresdee, but his headstone bears the name John, because of a mistake caused by his brother-in-law. He was born in Gosport, Hampshire, on 8 July 1920 to Harold Cresdee and Martha Hamlet.
He died in an explosion whilst surveying the wreck of the submarine HMS P36 in Lazaretto Creek, Malta, when a build-up of gases in the submarines fuel tanks were ignited by the flame of his underwater cutting gear.
His body was recovered the next day by Royal Navy clearance diver Lt Cdr George Wookey.

References

External links
http://www.historicalrfa.org/rfa-sea-salvor-ships-details
http://www.rfanostalgia.org/gallery3/index.php/RFA-TUGS-SALVAGE/Salvage

King Salvor-class salvage vessels
Ships built in Goole
1944 ships